The Players Tour Championship 2011/2012 was a series of snooker tournaments which started on 18 June 2011 and ended on 18 March 2012 with events held in England and Europe. European events were no longer called Euro Players Tour Championship (EPTC) and were included alongside other PTC events. The twelve regular events were minor-ranking events, which were concluded with the Finals.

Schedule

Order of Merit

Finals

The Finals of the Players Tour Championship 2011/2012 took place between 14–18 March 2012 at the Bailey Allen Hall in Galway, Ireland. It was contested by the top 24 players of the Order of Merit, who had played in at least 6 events (3 in the UK and 3 in Europe).

Notes

References